The BMW 132 was a nine-cylinder radial aircraft engine produced by BMW starting in 1933.

Design and development
BMW took over a license for manufacturing air-cooled radial engines from Pratt & Whitney on 3 January 1928. The nine-cylinder model Pratt & Whitney R-1690 Hornet was initially manufactured virtually unchanged under the designation BMW Hornet.

Soon BMW embarked on its own development. The result was the BMW 132, essentially an improved version of the Hornet engine, that went into production in 1933. A number of different versions were built; aside from the carburetor designs used mainly in civilian aircraft, versions with direct fuel injection were manufactured for the German Luftwaffe.

The 132 found widespread use in the transport role, remaining the primary powerplant of the Junkers Ju 52 for much of its life, turning the BMW 132 into one of the most important aircraft engines for civilian aircraft during the 1930s.

Numerous pioneering flights were undertaken with the BMW 132. The most impressive was the first direct flight from Berlin to New York in a four-engined Focke-Wulf 200 S-1 Condor. It covered the distance to New York in 24 hours and 57 minutes on 10 August 1938.

Variants
132A725 PS (715 hp, 533 kW)
132Dc850 PS (838 hp, 625 kW)
132De880 PS (868 hp, 647 kW)
132J/K960 PS (947 hp, 706 kW) with higher rpm
132N865 PS (853 hp, 636 kW)
132T730 PS (720 hp, 537 kW)
132W1065 PS (1050 hp, 783 kW)
ENMA Beta B-4 (Spanish license-built version)(9E-C29-775)  (stroke , displacement )

Applications
 Arado Ar 196
 Arado Ar 197
 Blohm & Voss Ha 140
 Blohm & Voss BV 141
 Blohm & Voss BV 142
 Dornier Do 17P
 Fieseler Fi 98
 Focke-Wulf Fw 200 Condor
 Heinkel He 114
 Heinkel He 115
 Henschel Hs 123
 IAR 38
 Junkers W 34
 Junkers Ju 52
 Junkers Ju 86
 Junkers Ju 90
 Junkers Ju 160

Specifications (BMW 132 Dc)

See also

References

Bibliography

External links

Aircraft air-cooled radial piston engines
BMW aircraft engines
1930s aircraft piston engines